The 1978 New Brunswick general election was held on October 23, 1978, to elect 58 members to the 49th New Brunswick Legislative Assembly, the governing house of the province of New Brunswick, Canada. Richard Hatfield's Progressive Conservative Party narrowly won its third term.

The result was the closest in New Brunswick history: the governing PCs won 30 seats to 28 for the opposition.  The popular vote was very close: 146,719 votes were cast for Conservative candidates, and 146,596 for Liberals. In order to secure a workable majority following the election, Hatfield appointed Liberal Robert McCready as speaker of the legislature, despite strong objections from McCready's Liberal colleagues; McCready went on to seek re-election as a Conservative and served in Hatfield's cabinet.

The Parti Acadien had its best ever showing in the election, winning 12% of the vote in the ridings where it fielded candidates, and coming within 200 votes of electing Armand Plourde in Restigouche West.

Background
In the lead up to 1978, the Opposition Liberal Party seemed destined to return to power.  A number of scandals had been tied to the Conservatives and Liberal leader Robert Higgins was widely popular. In early 1978, Higgins believed he had tied some of the scandals directly to Hatfield himself.  In a bold move, Higgins promised to resign should Hatfield prove that he was not tied directly to the scandal, which Hatfield promptly did.  Higgins was forced to abruptly resign and was replaced by Joseph Daigle as leader.  The Liberals mused that Hatfield had purposely ensured false information was leaked to the Liberals to lead them into making false accusations.

Higgins' resignation created Hatfield's best chance to go to the polls. He called an election shortly after Daigle became Liberal leader. Despite the lack of a direct link to Hatfield, scandal remained tied to his government and a close election result was assured.

Campaign
Hatfield's government was not entirely clean, however. The Liberals pointed to the Conservatives' budgets, which no longer maintained a surplus. The Bricklin failure was also fresh on voters' minds. While campaigning in anglophone sections of the province, Hatfield accused Daigle of being an anti-monarchist for supporting Pierre Trudeau's constitutional reforms.

Results

Results by riding

North 

Consisting of Victoria, Madawaska, Restigouche and Gloucester county ridings.

|-
|bgcolor=whitesmoke|Victoria-Tobique
||
|J. Douglas Moore 2,763
|
|Bruce Hoyt 2,032
|
|Earl W. Christensen 727
|
|
||
|J. Stewart Brooks†
|-
|bgcolor=whitesmoke|Grand Falls
|
|Joseph H. Rideout 1,063
||
|Everard H. Daigle 2,779
|
|Guildoi Pelletier 621
|
|
||
|Everard H. Daigle
|-
|bgcolor=whitesmoke|Madawaska-les-Lacs
||
|Jean-Pierre Ouellet 2,876
|
|Nelson Bellefleur 2,071
|
|
|
|Yves C. LeClerc (Parti acadien) 90
||
|Jean-Pierre Ouellet
|-
|bgcolor=whitesmoke|Madawaska Centre
|
|Léonard Plourde 1,352
||
|Gérald Clavette 2,208
|
|
|
|Aline Thérèse Gagnon (Parti acadien) 106
||
|Gérald Clavette
|-
|bgcolor=whitesmoke|Edmundston
||
|Jean-Maurice Simard 3,228
|
|Donald D'Amours 2,470
|
|
|
|Céline Couturier (Parti acadien) 194
||
|Jean-Maurice Simard
|-
|bgcolor=whitesmoke|Madawaska South
|
|Jean-Marc Violette 1,398
||
|Héliodore Côté 1,832
|
|
|
|Père Léo Theriault (Ind.) 659Jacques Lapointe (Parti acadien) 137
||
|Daniel Daigle†
|-
|bgcolor=whitesmoke|Restigouche West
|
|Jean Guy Ramond 1,576
||
|Alfred J. Roussel 2,174
|
|
|
|Armand Plourde (Parti acadien) 2,003
||
|Alfred J. Roussel
|-
|bgcolor=whitesmoke|Campbellton
||
|Fernand G. Dubé 2,734
|
|J. H. Wilfred Senechal 2,467
|
|Bryce Andrew 331
|
|Paul Aubin (Parti acadien) 337
||
|Fernand G. Dubé
|-
|bgcolor=whitesmoke|Dalhousie
|
|Aubrey Brownie 2,201
||
|Allan E. Maher 2,726
|
|Léopold Arseneault 274
|
|Réal Gendron (Parti acadien) 246
||
|John Potter†
|-
|bgcolor=whitesmoke|Restigouche East
|
|Guy Laviolette 1,402
||
|Rayburn Donald Doucett 2,035
|
|Gail Walsh 509
|
|Roland Godin (Parti acadien) 217
||
|Rayburn Donald Doucett
|-
|bgcolor=whitesmoke|Nigadoo-Chaleur
|
|Roland Boudreau 2,346
||
|Pierre Godin 2,960
|
|Kevin O'Connell 387
|
|Dr. Jean-Pierre Lanteigne (Parti acadien) 1,103
||
|Roland Boudreau
|-
|bgcolor=whitesmoke|Nepisiguit-Chaleur
|
|Hilaire Brideau 1,102
||
|Frank Branch 3,156
|
|
|
|Paul-Émile Mourant (Parti acadien) 858
||
|Frank Branch
|-
|bgcolor=whitesmoke|Bathurst
|
|John A. Duffy 2,075
||
|Paul Kenny 2,667
|
|Kevin Mann 2,176
|
|Lucie Losier (Parti acadien) 560
||
|Eugene McGinley†
|-
|bgcolor=whitesmoke|Caraquet
|
|Beatrice "Bibi" Doiron 2,809
||
|Onil Doiron 3,925
|
|
|
|Michel Blanchard (Parti acadien) 1,534
||
|Onil Doiron
|-
|bgcolor=whitesmoke|Shippagan-les-Îles
||
|Jean Gauvin 3,023
|
|André Robichaud 2,476
|
|
|
|Michel Haché (Ind.) 1,280Laval Auclair (Parti acadien) 466
||
|André Robichaud
|-
|bgcolor=whitesmoke|Tracadie
|
|George McLaughlin 2,490
||
|Doug Young 4,374
|
|
|
|Alyre Morais (Parti acadien) 806
||
|Adjutor Ferguson†
|}

Central 
Consisting of Carleton, York, Sunbury and Northumberland county ridings.

|-
|bgcolor=whitesmoke|Carleton North
||
|Charles G. Gallagher 2,397
|
|Samuel J. "Sam" Perkins 1,694
|
|
|
|
||
|Charles G. Gallagher
|-
|bgcolor=whitesmoke|Carleton Centre
||
|Richard B. Hatfield 2,043
|
|David Crouse 1,734
|
|
|
|
||
|Richard B. Hatfield
|-
|bgcolor=whitesmoke|Carleton South
||
|Steven P. Porter 2,317
|
|Pat Saunders 1,776
|
|Garth Brewer 389
|
|
||
|A. Edison Stairs†
|-
|bgcolor=whitesmoke|York North
||
|Adelbert David Bishop 3,681
|
|Richard Albert Carr 3,137
|
|Albert Fraser MacDonald 741
|
|
||
|Adelbert David Bishop
|-
|bgcolor=whitesmoke|York South
||
|Leslie "Les" Hull 4,440
|
|Blaine E. Hatt 3,036
|
|Mark Allen Canning 444
|
|
||
|Les Hull
|-
|bgcolor=whitesmoke|Fredericton South
||
|J. W. "Bud" Bird 5,525
|
|Stephen Patterson 4,252
|
|Margo Dunn 643
|
|Harry John Marshall (Ind.) 92
||
|George Everett Chalmers†
|-
|bgcolor=whitesmoke|Fredericton North
||
|Edwin G. Allen 5,304
|
|Carl Edward Howe 3,528
|
|Christopher Devlin Hicks 662
|
|
||
|Lawrence Garvie†
|-
|bgcolor=whitesmoke|Sunbury
||
|Horace Smith 3,045
|
|Ted Rogers 2,233
|
|Randy E. Brodeur 373
|
|
||
|Horace Smith
|-
|bgcolor=whitesmoke|Oromocto
|
|John Edward McKee 2,467
||
|LeRoy Washburn 2,522
|
|Jim Aucoin 283
|
|
||
|LeRoy Washburn
|-
|bgcolor=whitesmoke|Southwest Miramichi
|
|John Munn 2,578
||
|Morris Green 2,725
|
|
|
|
||
|Sterling Hambrook†
|-
|bgcolor=whitesmoke|Miramichi-Newcastle
|
|Douglas R. Woods 3,127
||
|John McKay 3,200
|
|
|
|
||
|John McKay
|-
|bgcolor=whitesmoke|Chatham
|
|Greg Barry 2,019
||
|Frank E. Kane 2,920
|
|Lloyd Vienneau 379
|
|
||
|Frank E. Kane
|-
|bgcolor=whitesmoke|Bay du Vin
|
|Robert S. Lamkey 1,816
||
|L. Norbert Thériault 2,515
|
|
|
|Joseph Alban Mazerolle (Ind.) 101
||
|L. Norbert Thériault
|-
|bgcolor=whitesmoke|Miramichi Bay
|
|James Kenneth Gordon 1,750
||
|Edgar LeGresley 2,232
|
|
|
|Solomon Curry (Ind.) 1,524
||
|Edgar LeGresley
|}

South West 
Consisting of Queens, Kings, Saint John and Charlotte county ridings.

|-
|bgcolor=whitesmoke|Queens North
||
|Wilfred George Bishop 2,059
|
|Eva Andries 1,145
|
|
|
|
||
|Wilfred George Bishop
|-
|bgcolor=whitesmoke|Queens South
|
|A.P. Hetherington 1,446
||
|Robert B. McCready 1,577
|
|Charles Viger 202
|
|
||
|Robert Corbett†
|-
|bgcolor=whitesmoke|Kings West
||
|John B. M. Baxter 4,047
|
|Jack Stevens 3,023
|
|George Little 1,132
|
|
||
|John B. M. Baxter
|-
|bgcolor=whitesmoke|Kings Centre
||
|Harold N. Fanjoy 3,284
|
|David L. Nice 2,130
|
|R. Harvey Watson 745
|
|
||
|Harold N. Fanjoy
|-
|bgcolor=whitesmoke|Kings East
||
|Hazen Myers 3,251
|
|Gordon A. Lewis 2,135
|
|Ernest A. Seedhouse 342
|
|
||
|George Horton†
|-
|bgcolor=whitesmoke|Saint John Fundy
||
|Beverly J. Harrison 2,196
|
|Kevin Kilfoil 1,370
|
|Larry Hanley 932
|
|
||
|William J. Woodroffe†
|-
|bgcolor=whitesmoke|East Saint John
||
|G.S. "Gerry" Merrithew 3,626
|
|George Creary 2,220
|
|Douglas Justason 1,143
|
|
||
|Gerry Merrithew
|-
|bgcolor=whitesmoke|Saint John Harbour
|
|E. Lorne Richardson 1,680
||
|Louis E. Murphy 1,772
|
|Harrison G. Harvey 625
|
|
||
|John Turnbull†
|-
|bgcolor=whitesmoke|Saint John South
||
|Nancy Clark 1,622
|
|John P. Mooney 1,543
|
|David M. Brown 416
|
|
||
|John P. Mooney
|-
|bgcolor=whitesmoke|Saint John Park
|
|Garry Bona 1,677
||
|Shirley Dysart 1,976
|
|David T. Pye 551
|
|
||
|Robert J. Higgins†
|-
|bgcolor=whitesmoke|Saint John North
||
|Eric J. Kipping 1,906
|
|Harry G. Colwell 1,569
|
|Henry Thomas Watts 430
|
|
||
|Shirley Dysart*
|-
|bgcolor=whitesmoke|Saint John West
||
|Rodman Emmason Logan 3,935
|
|Delvan G. O'Brien 2,411
|
|James William Orr 886
|
|
||
|Rodman Emmason Logan
|-
|bgcolor=whitesmoke|Charlotte-Fundy
||
|James Nelson Tucker 1,741
|
|Bernard L. Moses 1,311
|
|George Robertson 164
|
|
||
|James Nelson Tucker
|-
|bgcolor=whitesmoke|Charlotte Centre
|
|Robert D. "Bob" Lee 1,210
||
|Sheldon Lee 1,404
|
|
|
|
||
|DeCosta Young†
|-
|bgcolor=whitesmoke|Charlotte West
||
|Leland W. McGaw 1,815
|
|Philip Earl Johnson 1,074
|
|William C. Mosher 201
|
|
||
|Leland W. McGaw
|-
|bgcolor=whitesmoke|St. Stephen-Milltown
||
|Bill Cockburn 1,986
|
|Sydney Holmes 1,238
|
|Charles Roland Campbell 136
|
|
||
|Bill Cockburn
|}

South East 
Consisting of Kent, Westmorland and Albert county ridings.

|-
|bgcolor=whitesmoke|Kent North
|
|Louis Arsenault 1,070
||
|Joseph Daigle 3,156
|
|
|
|Philippe Ouellette (Parti acadien) 358
||
|Joseph Z. Daigle
|-
|bgcolor=whitesmoke|Kent Centre
|
|Claude Giruan Warren 1,171
||
|Alan Robert Graham 2,352
|
|John B. LaBossiere 249
|
|Pierrette Leblanc (Parti acadien) 121
||
|Alan Robert Graham
|-
|bgcolor=whitesmoke|Kent South
|
|Omer Léger 3,279
||
|Bertin LeBlanc 4,276
|
|
|
|Dolan Surette (Parti acadien) 138
||
|Omer Léger
|-
|bgcolor=whitesmoke|Shediac
|
|Régis Cormier
||
|Azor LeBlanc 5,342
|
|
|
|Henri-Eugène Duguay (Parti acadien) 603
||
|Azor LeBlanc
|-
|bgcolor=whitesmoke|Tantramar
||
|Lloyd Folkins 2,019
|
|James G. Purdy 1,232
|
|Robert Arthur Hall 1,924
|
|
||
|Lloyd Folkins
|-
|bgcolor=whitesmoke|Memramcook
|
|Euclide Daigle 1,348
||
|William "Bill" Malenfant 4,605
|
|Joseph Eugene Guy LeBlanc 345
|
|Donatien Gaudet (Parti acadien) 643
||
|Bill Malenfant
|-
|bgcolor=whitesmoke|Moncton East
|
|Raymond J. Thibodeau 2,006
||
|Ray Frenette 3,921
|
|John William Kingston 592
|
|Simone LeBlanc-Rainsville (Parti acadien) 469
||
|Ray Frenette
|-
|bgcolor=whitesmoke|Moncton North
|
|Albert L. Galbraith 3,023
||
|Father Mike McKee 4,362
|
|Guy J. Richard 477
|
|David Britton (Parti acadien) 225
||
|Mike McKee
|-
|bgcolor=whitesmoke|Moncton West
||
|Mabel DeWare 4,211
|
|Donald A. Canning 2,831
|
|
|
|Paul Hebert (Parti acadien) 230
||
|Paul Creaghan†
|-
|bgcolor=whitesmoke|Petitcodiac
||
|C.W. "Bill" Harmer 4,911
|
|Harold Alward 3,420
|
|Ronald McGrath 621
|
|Rev. C. Edward Pickett (Ind.) 556Patrick D. Clarke (Parti acadien) 117
||
|Bill Harmer
|-
|bgcolor=whitesmoke|Riverview
||
|Brenda M. Robertson 4,443
|
|W. A. "Bill" Payne 1,967
|
|
|
|
||
|Brenda M. Robertson
|-
|bgcolor=whitesmoke|Albert
||
|Malcolm MacLeod 2,669
|
|Grant William Colpitts 1,289
|
|Robert J. Candy 351
|
|
||
|Malcolm MacLeod
|}

1978 elections in Canada
Elections in New Brunswick
1978 in New Brunswick
October 1978 events in Canada